Three Faces West is a 1940 American drama film directed by Bernard Vorhaus and starring John Wayne, Sigrid Gurie and Charles Coburn.

The film, mainly set in North Dakota was one of a handful of overtly anti-Nazi films produced by Hollywood before American entry into World War II.  Isolationists and Nazi sympathizers condemned other Hollywood movies for being pro-British "propaganda" or for "glorifying war", however Three Faces West was deliberately crafted to celebrate the pioneer spirit of America, and the determination of Americans to survive the dust bowl, and contrasted these values with the evils of Nazism, thus preventing isolationists and Nazi sympathizers from being able to criticize the film as they had criticized other anti-Nazi films during this period.

Writing in the Journal of Austrian-American History, Jacqueline Vansant has argued that the film "takes a bold stand on contemporary issues through its Austrian-American romance."

Plot
Two refugees, the Brauns, an elderly medical doctor and his 20-something-year-old daughter arrive in the USA from Nazi-controlled Austria.

They become a much-needed physician and nurse in a small North Dakota farm town. The town is located in the area later known as the Dust Bowl, and is being hit hard by the drought and resultant dust storms.

The local farmers and townspeople want to try to save their farms and the town by adopting new farming methods, but are eventually convinced by the Department of Agriculture, and the continuing dust storms to pack up the whole town and move en-masse to an undeveloped portion of Oregon. There a new dam is set to create a water supply, enabling them to build a new farming community.

In a then-contemporary version of an old wagon train, the town moves as a convoy of cars to Oregon, under John Phillips's leadership, not without differences of opinion and friction among the followers.

The doctor and his daughter take a detour to San Francisco when they learn that the daughter's fiance was not killed by the Nazis in Austria, but has instead come to America. However, the fiance has embraced Nazism, and their different ideologies now mean marriage is not possible. The doctor and his daughter rejoin the transplanted town in Oregon, where the daughter marries Phillips instead (John Wayne).

Cast
 John Wayne as John Phillips
 Sigrid Gurie as Leni "Lenchen" Braun
 Charles Coburn as Dr. Karl Braun
 Spencer Charters as Dr. "Nunk" Atterbury
 Helen MacKellar as Mrs. Welles
 Roland Varno as Dr. Eric Von Scherer
 Sonny Bupp as Billy Welles
 Wade Boteler as Mr. Harris, Department of Agriculture Official
 Trevor Bardette as Clem Higgins
 Russell Simpson as Minister
 Charles Waldron as Dr. William Thorpe
 Wendell Niles as Man-on-the-Street Radio Announcer

See also
 John Wayne filmography

References

External links
 
 
 
 

1940 films
1940 romantic drama films
American romantic drama films
American black-and-white films
Films scored by Victor Young
Films directed by Bernard Vorhaus
Films set in North Dakota
Films set in Oregon
Films produced by Sol C. Siegel
Films with screenplays by F. Hugh Herbert
Republic Pictures films
1940s English-language films
1940s American films